This article contains the results of the senior Tipperary county hurling team in the Championship during the 1970s.

Tipperary played 19 Championship games during the decade, winning 7, losing 9 and drawing 3. They won 1 Munster titles in 1971 and won 1 All Ireland title in 1971.

1970

1971

1972

1973

1974

1975

1976

1977

1978

1979

References

External links
Tipperary GAA Fan site
Tipperary on Hoganstand.com
Tipperary GAA site
Premierview
Tipperary GAA Archives

1970 in hurling
1971 in hurling
1972 in hurling
1973 in hurling
1974 in hurling
1975 in hurling
1976 in hurling
1977 in hurling
1978 in hurling
1979 in hurling
7